Sergio Infante (born May 1, 1947 in Santiago de Chile) is a Chilean  poet, essayist, university professor and writer, who resides in Sweden.

Life 
In the late 60s, Sergio Infante led an intense cultural life in the artistic circles of the Chilean capital, and at the same time studied at the School of Fine Arts of Santiago. During that period infante published his first collection of poems: Gray Abysses (1967). Due to his social commitment and because of the prevailing political climate in Chile, he took a leave from his art studies and moved from Santiago to Chiloe Island, located in southern Chile.

Infante was living in Chiloe when the military coup of 1973 led by General Augusto Pinochet occurred. He was forced into exile, and left Chile for Argentina. In Buenos Aires Infante stayed just for a few months and continued his way to Sweden where he got refugee status in 1975.

In 1977, Sergio Infante, together with his countrymen, poets Adrian Santini, and Carlos Geywitz founded the lyrical Group Taller of Stockholm, which would also include,  another Chilean poet Sergio Badilla Castillo, in 1978.

In the late 80s, Sergio Infante, by that time Doctor in Spanish and Latin American Literature, became professor at the Department of Spanish, Portuguese and Latin American Studies at Stockholm University .

Bibliography 

	Abismos grises/Gray Abysses (1967), Poetry
	Exilios / Exiles (1979), Poetry
	Retrato de Época/Portrait of an Epoch (1982) Poetry 
	El amor de los parias / Love of the pariahs (1990). Poetry 
	El estigma de la falsedad /Stigma of Falseness (1991). Essay
	La del Alba Sería /The one from dawn would be. RIL Editors, Santiago de Chile, (2002) Poetry.
	Los rebaños del cíclope, Santiago de Chile, (2008). Novel.

References 
Anthology The winged Lion
Sergio Infante in Chileweb
Instituto Cervantes

1947 births
Living people
Chilean male poets
People from Santiago
20th-century Chilean poets
20th-century Chilean male writers
21st-century Chilean poets
21st-century Chilean male writers